Waltzing Regitze, also known as Memories of a Marriage, (Original title: Dansen med Regitze) is a 1989 Danish drama film directed by Kaspar Rostrup. Based upon a popular Danish novel by Martha Christensen, the film is an unsentimental portrait of the history and changes of a middle-aged couple's marriage, told through flashbacks during a summer party. The film stars Ghita Nørby and Frits Helmuth.

Waltzing Regitze was nominated for the Academy Award for Best Foreign Language Film. In 1990, it won the Robert Award for Film of the Year and swept the Bodil Awards, winning Best Danish Film as well as all four of acting categories.

Cast

See also 
 List of submissions to the 62nd Academy Awards for Best Foreign Language Film
 List of Danish submissions for the Academy Award for Best Foreign Language Film

References

External links 
 
 
 

1989 drama films
1989 films
Best Danish Film Bodil Award winners
Best Danish Film Robert Award winners
Danish drama films
1980s Danish-language films
Films scored by Fuzzy (composer)